De Wereld van K3 (meaning The World of K3) was a daily Flemish–Dutch kids talk show broadcast on Nederland 3 in the Netherlands and on Vtm in Belgium. The hostesses were the girls of the girl band K3. The talk show took place in The K3 Club House, where the girls have their guests, like various famous people from the Netherlands and Belgium, with kids as the audience.

The show has a chef, who makes something with the kids daily, a magician who teaches the kids a special trick and Martin Gaus who shows the kids an animal. Every episode also features a performance by a special guest.

Dutch television talk shows
VTM (TV channel) original programming